None but the Brave (1928) is an American silent film, released by Fox Film Corporation, directed by Albert Ray, and starring Charles Morton as Charles Stanton, Sally Phipps as Mary.  The film also co-starred J. Farrell MacDonald, Sharon Lynn, and Tom Kennedy. One or two sequences were filmed in a two-strip Technicolor, made of black-and-white 35mm film dyed in colors. The film consists of six reels.

It is not known whether this film survives or is a lost film.

See also
 List of early color feature films

References

External links
 
 None but the Brave at SilentEra

1928 films
1920s color films
Fox Film films
American silent feature films
Silent films in color
1928 romantic comedy films
American romantic comedy films
1920s American films
Silent romantic comedy films
Silent American comedy films